The Gateway Hills are a prominent pair of hills,  high, immediately west of Husky Pass at the head of Sledgers Glacier, in the Bowers Mountains of Victoria Land, Antarctica. They were so named by the New Zealand Antarctic Place-Names Committee in 1983 on a proposal by geologist M.G. Laird because the hills bound the southern entrance to adjacent Sledgers Glacier. These hills lie situated on the Pennell Coast, a portion of Antarctica lying between Cape Williams and Cape Adare respectively.

References

Hills of Antarctica
Pennell Coast
Landforms of Victoria Land